Zeuxippus histrio is a species of spider in the jumping spider family, Salticidae. It is found in India.

References
  (2000): An Introduction to the Spiders of South East Asia. Malaysian Nature Society, Kuala Lumpur.
  (2009): The world spider catalog, version 9.5. American Museum of Natural History.

Salticidae
Spiders of Asia
Spiders described in 1891